Balanitis is inflammation of the glans penis. When the foreskin is also affected, the proper term is balanoposthitis. Balanitis on boys still in diapers must be distinguished from redness caused by ammoniacal dermatitis. The word balanitis is from the Greek βάλανος , literally meaning 'acorn', used because of the similarity in shape to the glans penis.

Signs and symptoms
 Small red erosions on the glans (first sign)
 Redness of the foreskin
 Redness of the penis
 Other rashes on the head of the penis
 Foul smelling discharge
 Painful foreskin and penis

Complications
Recurrent bouts of balanitis may cause scarring of the preputial orifice; the reduced elasticity may lead to pathologic phimosis. Further complications may include: 
 Stricture of urethral meatus
 Phimosis
 Paraphimosis

Cause
Inflammation has many possible causes, including irritation by environmental substances, physical trauma, and infection such as bacterial, viral, or fungal. Some of these infections are sexually transmitted diseases.

It is less common among people who are circumcised, as in many cases, a dysfunction of the foreskin is a causal or contributing factor. Both not enough cleaning and too much cleaning can cause problems. Diabetes can make balanitis more likely, especially if the blood sugar is poorly controlled.

It is important to exclude other causes of similar symptoms such as penile cancer.

Diagnosis
Diagnosis may include careful identification of the cause with the aid of a good patient history, swabs and cultures, and pathological examination of a biopsy.

Types 
 Zoon's balanitis, also known as Balanitis Circumscripta Plasmacellularis or plasma cell balanitis (PCB), is an idiopathic, rare, benign penile dermatosis for which circumcision is often the preferred treatment.  Zoon's balanitis has been successfully treated with the carbon dioxide laser;  and more recently, Albertini and colleagues report the avoidance of circumcision and successful treatment of Zoon's balanitis with an Er:YAG laser. Another study, by Retamar and colleagues, found that 40 percent of those treated with CO2 laser relapsed.
 Circinate balanitis, also known as balanitis circinata, is a serpiginous annular dermatitis associated with reactive arthritis.
 Pseudoepitheliomatous keratotic and micaceous balanitis

Treatment
Initial treatment in adults often involves simply pulling back the foreskin and cleaning the penis.
However, some topical antibiotic and fungal ointments may be used for treatment for mild cases.
Depending upon severity, hydrocortisone and other steroidal creams may be used upon consultation.

Epidemiology
Balanitis "is a common condition affecting 11% of adult men seen in urology clinics and 3% of children" in the United States; globally, balanitis "may occur in up to 3% of uncircumcised males".

Other animals

In dogs, balanoposthitis is caused by a disruption in the integumentary system, such as a wound or intrusion of a foreign body. A dog with this condition behaves normally, with the exception of excessive licking at the prepuce, and a yellow green, pus-like discharge is usually present.

In sheep (rams/wethers), ulcerative enzootic balanoposthitis is caused by the Corynebacterium renale group (C. renale, C. pilosum & C. cystidis).

For the condition in bulls, caused by a virus see Bovine herpesvirus 1.

Balanoposthitis is believed to have contributed to the decline to near-extinction of Gilbert's potoroo.

References

Further reading
Edwards S. (for the Clinical Effectiveness Group) National guideline on the management of balanitis. Association for Genitourinary Medicine (UK) and the Medical Society for the Study of Venereal Diseases (UK), 2001.

External links 

Dermatological atlas

Circumcision debate
Inflammations
Penis disorders
Theriogenology